Lauste (Finnish; Laustis in Swedish) is a district and a suburb of the city of Turku, Finland. It is located in the eastern part of the city, bordering the neighbouring city of Kaarina. It is rather densely populated, having a population of 3,405. Its population is rapidly decreasing, however – it has an annual population growth rate of -5.73%, which is the lowest of all districts of Turku.

17.00% of the district's population are under 15 years old, while 11.51% are over 65. The district's linguistic makeup is 75.18% Finnish, 1.59% Swedish, and 23.23% other. This reflects the fact that Lauste is one of the areas with the highest proportion of immigrants in the city.

See also
 Districts of Turku
 Districts of Turku by population

Districts of Turku